Maryam Keshavarz is an American filmmaker(Iranian pedigreed) best known for her 2011 film Circumstance  distributed by Participant Media and Roadside Attractions, which won the Audience Award at Sundance Film Festival.

Biography

Maryam received her BA in Comparative Literature from Northwestern University, an MA in Near Eastern Studies from the University of Michigan, Ann Arbor, and an MFA in Film Direction from New York University, Tisch School of the Arts. She was also a visiting scholar at the University of Shiraz, Department of Language and Literature.

In 2001, with a band of all girl crew and cast, Maryam directed her first experimental 16mm film, entitled Sanctuary. This surreal fantasy film about an Iranian woman in post-9/11 America traveled to several international festivals and landed Maryam the Steve Tisch fellowship to attend NYU's graduate film program.

In 2003, Maryam drew on her experience growing up between Iran and the United States to direct her first feature documentary, The Color of Love. An intimate portrait of the changing landscape of love and politics in Iran, the documentary showed at international festivals such as Montreal World Film Fest, Full Frame Doc Fest, MoMA New York, It's All True (Brazil), among others; it garnered top prizes such as the International Documentary Association's David L. Wolper Award, Jury Award at DocuDays, and the Full Frame's Spectrum Award. The Color of Love has been broadcast internationally, was released on DVD by Parlour Pictures, and was featured on Danny DeVito's Jersey Docs, a subsidiary of Morgan Freeman's ClickStar.

In 2005, Maryam returned to Argentina, where she had studied Latin American literature at the University of Buenos Aires. There, she wrote and directed the visual essay The Day I Died about an adolescent love triangle in a sleepy Argentine seaside town. The Day I Died has been shown in Main Competition at Mar del Plata, Clermont-Ferrand, New York Film Festival and Berlin International Film Festival. The Day I Died was the only short film at Berlinale to win two awards: the Gold Teddy Best Short Film and the Jury Prize Special Mention. The film also won the Jury Prize at the Rio International Film Fest. The film is part of the DVD compilation by Shooting People entitled BEST v BEST VOL. 2: AWARD WINNING SHORT FILMS 2006.

Maryam's first narrative feature fiction film, Circumstance premiered to overwhelming critical acclaim at the 2011 Sundance Film Festival, garnering the Sundance Audience Award, leading to Maryam's inclusion in Deadline.com's 2011 Director's to Watch. Circumstance has won over a dozen international awards including Best First Film at the Rome Film Festival and the Audience & Best Actress Awards at Outfest. The Independent Spirit Award nominated film was described by the New York Times as "Swirling and sensuous", by the Wall Street Journal as "Supremely cinematic", and by the Hollywood Reporter as "Amazingly accomplished."  The film released theatrically in over a dozen countries in 2012.

More recently, Maryam's newest film project The Last Harem won the prestigious Hearst Screenwriters Grant and the San Francisco Film Society/ KRF Screenwriting Award, while her museum installation work entitled BETWEEN SIGHT AND DESIRE: IMAGINING THE MUSLIM WOMAN won a multi-year grant from Creative Capital. Maryam has also been tapped to co-write and direct the narrative adaptation of the award-winning HBO documentary Hot Coffee.

Maryam is an alumna of the Sundance Screenwriters and Directors Lab, Tribeca Film Institute's All Access Program. She is the recipient of dozens of grants and fellowships including the French Government's Fonds Sud, Rotterdam Film Festivals' Hubert Bals Award, Women in Film's Grant, Adrienne Shelly Award, numerous Sundance fellowships, and multiple San Francisco Film Society grants. She has been a visiting artist at the University of Pennsylvania and guest lecturer at dozens of prestigious international universities. She is an active member of Film Independent serving as a mentor for their Project Involve Initiative and speaking on numerous filmmaking panels.

Personal life
Keshavarz is bisexual.

Filmography and awards

See also
 Cinema of Iran
 List of famous Persian women

References

External links

Keshavarz at Stardustbrands
https://web.archive.org/web/20160818010336/http://esmatlyintercultural.blogfa.com/post-70.aspx 
نقدی بر فیلم شرایط ساخته مریم کشاورز A Review on “Circumstance” by Maryam Keshavarz
Advocate – State of Affairs 
– In Movies by Iranians, a Feminist Streak
The Bay Area Reporter – Iranian Youth Culture Flowers in 'Circumstance'
The Boston Globe – 'Circumstance': A Forbidden Love Story
The Boston Herald – Film Reveals 'Circumstance' of gays in Iran
College Movie Review
ComingSoon.net
The Daily Beast – Iran's Controversial New Lesbian Film
Daily Candy – 9 Film You Should Seek Out
Deadline Hollywood – Sundance: 2011 Film Directors to Watch
The Feminist Spectator – 'Circumstance'
Feminema – To Be Young, Gifted, & Living Under Patriarchy: 'Circumstance (2011)'
The Globe and Mail – "Circumstance': A Glimpse of the Miniskirts Under the Chadors
The Guardian (UK) – Maryam Keshavarz: 'In Iran, anything illegal becomes politically subversive'
Huff Post Culture – 'Circumstance' and Dangerous Elicitations of Truth
Huff Post Entertainment – Parties and Promiscuity In a Police State
IndieWire – Critical Consensus: Iran-Set Drama 'Circumstance' is The Pick of the Week
IndieWire 2 – Love and Risk in Iran: Circumstance Written and Directed by Maryam Keshavarz
IndieWire 3 – 'Circumstance's' Maryam Keshavarz Faces Threats, Fears DVD Release
Interview – Dubbing SATC in Tehran
Killer Movie Reviews – 'Circumstance' Lines of Discontent in Iran's Cultural Landscape
The New York Times – Living and Loving Underground in Iran
Reuters – 'Circumstance' Sheds Light on Gay Life in Iran
ScreenCrave.com – Sundance 2011: 'Circumstance' Movie Review 
St. Louis Post-Dispatch – 'Circumstance' Looks Inside Iranian Youth Culture
The Salt Lake Tribune – Sundance review: 'Circumstance'
USA TODAY – In 'Circumstance,' A sexual awakening in Iran
W Magazine – Nikohl Boosheri & Sarah Kazemy: The Provocative Screen Debut by Two Iranian Actresses 
The Washington Post – 'Circumstance': Forbidden Love in Today's Iran

American film directors
American people of Iranian descent
Iranian film directors
Living people
Northwestern University alumni
Shiraz University alumni
University of Michigan alumni
1975 births
Iranian LGBT people
LGBT people from New York (state)
American LGBT people of Asian descent
Tisch School of the Arts alumni
Iranian diaspora film people
Bisexual women
LGBT film directors